SS President Hayes may refer to:

 , Design 1095 steam passenger-cargo ship launched as Creole State by New York Shipbuilding in Camden, New Jersey.
 SS President Hayes (1941), a passenger-cargo variant of the C3 type, built by Newport News Shipbuilding in Newport News, Virginia and became  the same year, later APA-20.

Ship names